Perevoloka — village (selo) in Chortkiv Raion, Ternopil Oblast, of western Ukraine. It belongs to Buchach urban hromada, one of the hromadas of Ukraine.

The population of the village is about 2 368 people and local government is administered by Perevolotska village council.

Geography 

History and attractions 
The date of establishment the village is considered 1467, though the first written record dates from the 1379. Near the village found archeological sights of Cucuteni-Trypillian culture and Culture of ancient Rus. In the ancient book Nestor chronik from 1113 there is a note of a city named Perevoloka that was sacked in the year 1092. The Nestor chronik is all about the culture of ancient Rus.  
The village has a St. George Church (1895, stone), St. Trinity Church (1934, stone) and St. Josaphat Church.

Until 18 July 2020, Perevoloka belonged to Buchach Raion. The raion was abolished in July 2020 as part of the administrative reform of Ukraine, which reduced the number of raions of Ternopil Oblast to three. The area of Buchach Raion was merged into Chortkiv Raion.

Born in village 
Ivan Kulyk, Bishop of the Ukrainian Greek-Catholic church

References

External links 
 Село Переволока Бучацького району - Бучаччина – Тернопілля
 village Perevoloka
 weather.in.ua

Villages in Chortkiv Raion